Cyprus–Greece relations are the bilateral relations between Cyprus and Greece. Cyprus has an embassy in Athens and a consulate-general in Thessaloniki. Greece has an embassy in Nicosia. Both countries are full members of the United Nations, European Union, Council of Europe and the Organization for Security and Co-operation in Europe (OSCE). Relations between the two countries have been exceptionally close since the Republic of Cyprus was formed in 1960. The Greek populations in Cyprus and Greece share a common ethnicity, heritage, language, and religion, leading to an exceptionally close relationship between the two countries.

Economic relations
Traditionally, Greece has been the major export and import partner of Cyprus. In 2019, Greece produced $257,165.64 US Dollars in exports $1,855,624.30 US Dollars in imports for Cyprus, being Cyprus's first ranking import partner.

Similarity of Anthems
Greece and Cyprus have the same anthem. Greece adopted the anthem in 1865, while Cyprus adopted it in 1966.

Diplomatic missions

Republic of Cyprus
Athens (Embassy)
Thessaloniki (Consulate-General)

Republic of Greece
Nicosia (Embassy)

See also

 Foreign relations of Cyprus
 Foreign relations of Greece
 Energy Triangle
 Greek Cypriots
 Cypriot Greek
 Enosis
 Foreign Relations of Cyprus

References

External links

Cyprus Ministry of Foreign Affairs: list of bilateral treaties with Greece
Greek Ministry of Foreign Affairs about the relation with Cyprus
Greek Embassy in Nicosia

 
Greece
Cyprus